Odgers is a surname. Notable people with the surname include:
Candice Odgers, American psychologist
Cathy Odgers, New Zealand-born, Hong Kong-based former blogger – "Cactus Kate"
Gary Odgers (born 1959), Australian rules football
George Odgers (1916–2008), Australian soldier, journalist and military historian
Jayme Odgers (born 1939), American graphic designer
Jeff Odgers (born 1969), Canadian professional ice hockey player
Merle Middleton Odgers, American educator and president of Bucknell University
William Odgers (1834–73), British soldier and recipient of the Victoria Cross

See also
Odger
Odgers on Libel and Slander